Lorna Luft (born November 21, 1952) is an American actress, author, and singer. She is the daughter of Judy Garland and Sidney Luft and the half-sister of Liza Minnelli.

Early life
Luft was born on November 21, 1952, at Saint John's Health Center in Santa Monica, California to Judy Garland and Garland's third husband, Sidney Luft. She attended University High School in Los Angeles during her senior year and was a member of the school choir. She studied theatre at HB Studio in New York City.

Career

Stage and television
Luft made her show business debut at age 11, singing "Santa Claus Is Coming to Town" on the 1963 Christmas episode of Garland's CBS television series The Judy Garland Show. Siblings Liza Minnelli and Joey Luft also appeared. Garland sang the song "Lorna" to Luft on episode  20 of The Judy Garland Show in 1964: an original number composed by Mort Lindsey and Johnny Mercer especially for Luft at Garland's request. The song was later featured on the 2006 Garland compilation Great Day! Rare Recordings from the Judy Garland Show.

Luft soon joined the family act on a summer concert tour, the highlight of which was Garland's third and final appearance at New York's famed Palace Theatre on Broadway in 1967, two years before her mother's death. In this month-long engagement,  Garland "shared" the bill with Luft (then 14 years old) and Joey (12 years old). The show was recorded live and released on ABC Records as Judy Garland at Home at the Palace.

Luft made her Broadway debut in 1971 at the Shubert Theatre as a replacement cast member in the musical Promises, Promises, adapted from the classic 1960 Billy Wilder film The Apartment. It is best known for the hit song "I'll Never Fall in Love Again".

On October 7, 1981, Luft performed at Carnegie Hall in New York, which was said to be the culmination of a lifelong dream. She starred in the 1981–82 national tour of They're Playing Our Song, and in 1982 she played Paulette Rebchuck in Grease 2. In 1983, she played Peppermint Patty in the off-Broadway production of Snoopy! The Musical, a sequel to You're a Good Man, Charlie Brown. Later that year, she costarred in Extremities with Farrah Fawcett.

Luft appeared as Nurse Libby Kegler on the CBS television series Trapper John, M.D. during its final season of 1985–1986. She also appeared as Patti Bristol in "Broadway Malady", a 1985 episode of Murder, She Wrote. In the episode, Luft played the daughter of Vivian Blaine, who had originated the role of Adelaide in Guys and Dolls on Broadway, while Luft would go on to play the same role in the 1992–1994 national and worldwide tours.

In 1996, Luft appeared in an Irish production of Follies in Dublin with Mary Millar, Alex Sharpe, Christine Scarry, Aidan Conway, Enda Markey, Dave Willetts and Millicent Martin. In 2002, she starred as Mama Rose in a University of Richmond school production of Gypsy.

In December 1995, Luft released a cover version of "Have Yourself a Merry Little Christmas", which was reworked as a "virtual duet" with Garland. Produced by Gordon Lorenz, it was issued as a CD single only in the U.K. by the Carlton Sounds label. A music video featured Luft performing the song in a studio interspersed with classic footage of Garland singing to a then-11-year-old Luft on the 1963 Christmas episode of The Judy Garland Show, all placed on the same screen.

From November 2006 through January 2007, Luft performed in the U.K. premiere of Irving Berlin's White Christmas, a new stage adaptation based on the film. She reprised her role the next year, playing the Edinburgh Playhouse from November 19 to December 8, 2007, and the Wales Millennium Centre at the Donald Gordon Theatre from December 13, 2007, through January 12, 2008.

Luft appeared in four episodes of the 2007–2009 Logo animated series Rick & Steve: The Happiest Gay Couple in All the World.

In October 2007, Luft released her debut album Lorna Luft: Songs My Mother Taught Me in the U.K. Produced by Barry Manilow and Luft's husband Colin R. Freeman, the album celebrates Garland's music. In 2005, Luft toured Ireland with her stage show, Songs My Mother Taught Me. In June 2006, she surprised audiences at Carnegie Hall by performing a duet with Rufus Wainwright on the song "After You've Gone" at the end of Wainwright's tribute concert for Garland's triumphant 1961 comeback at the same venue.

Luft appeared in The Wizard Of Oz, a stage version of the movie that made Garland famous, at The Lowry in Manchester, England. She portrayed the role of the Wicked Witch of the West (played by Margaret Hamilton in the film).

In April 2009, Luft completed a successful U.K. tour of the critically acclaimed Hugh Whitemore play Pack of Lies, where she played the role of Helen Kroger, starring alongside Jenny Seagrove, Simon Shepherd, and Daniel Hill. In May 2009 she appeared in W magazine as a special guest performer for the acclaimed avant-garde Theo Adams Company's latest project, "Performance", photographed by David Sims. In July 2009, she appeared at the Mermaid Theatre, London to record for the radio series Friday Night Is Music Night. Lorna Luft and Friends – A Tribute to Judy Garland also featured John Barrowman, Frances Ruffelle, and Linzi Hateley.

Between May and July 2015, Luft toured the U.K. in Judy - The Songbook of Judy Garland, a show highlighting Garland's life and music. The show featured her signature songs and recreations of film scenes from her MGM years.

Film
Luft has appeared in the films Grease 2 (1982), Where the Boys Are '84 (1984), Fear Stalk (1989), 54 (1998) and My Giant (1998). She and her brother Joey made cameo appearances in the 1963 film I Could Go On Singing.

Author
Luft is the author of the 1998 book Me and My Shadows: A Family Memoir. Among its revelations is that she had an affair with Barry Manilow in 1971. In 2001, the book was adapted as an Emmy-winning TV miniseries called Life with Judy Garland: Me and My Shadows. It stars Judy Davis as the adult Judy, Tammy Blanchard as the teenage Judy, Hugh Laurie as Vincente Minnelli, Victor Garber as Sid Luft, and Marsha Mason as Ethel Gumm. Luft is the co-author, asking with film historian Jeffrey Vance, of the 2018 book A Star Is Born: Judy Garland and the Film That Got Away, which she describes as "a vivid account of the film classic's production, loss, and reclamation."

Personal life 
Luft participates in various children's and AIDS-related charities, including the annual Los Angeles AIDS Walk and The Children's Wish Foundation International. Luft and first husband Jerry Memberg, better known as Jake Hooker, were divorced in 1993. They had two children together, a son, Jesse, and a daughter, Vanessa and four grandchildren. She currently resides in Palm Springs, California, with her husband, the British-born composer and arranger, Colin Freeman.

Health

In June 2015, Luft revealed that she had cancer. Consequently, the U.K. tour of Judy - The Songbook of Judy Garland concluded early on July 11, and she returned to the U.S. for surgical treatment.

In March 2018, Luft was diagnosed with a brain tumor after collapsing following a London performance.
Later that month, Luft underwent surgery to remove the tumor. The surgery was successful, and Luft has since recovered.

Discography

Studio albums

Singles

Cast albums

Album appearances

DVD releases

Filmography

Stage productions

Published works
 , autobiography
 , biography
 , biography

References

External links

 Official website
 Lorna Luft at MySpace
 
 
 
 July 2008 interview with Lorna Luft on BroadwayWorld.com

1952 births
Living people
American people of Russian-Jewish descent
American people of German-Jewish descent
American people of English descent
American people of French descent
American people of Irish descent
American people of Scottish descent
Actresses from Santa Monica, California
American film actresses
American television actresses
American stage actresses
American musical theatre actresses
American voice actresses
Nightclub performers
20th-century American actresses
21st-century American actresses
20th-century American singers
21st-century American singers
20th-century American women singers
21st-century American women singers
20th-century American women writers
21st-century American women writers
University High School (Los Angeles) alumni
Judy Garland
American expatriates in England